The Dobermann, or Doberman Pinscher in the United States and Canada, is a medium-large breed of domestic dog that was originally developed around 1890 by Louis Dobermann, a tax collector from Germany. The Dobermann has a long muzzle. It stands on its pads and is not usually heavy-footed. Ideally, they have an even and graceful gait. Traditionally, the ears are cropped and posted and the tail is docked. However, in some countries, these procedures are now illegal and it is often considered cruel and unnecessary. Dobermanns have markings on the chest, paws/legs, muzzle, above the eyes, and underneath the tail.

Dobermanns are known to be intelligent, alert, and tenaciously loyal companions and guard dogs.

Appearance 
World breed standards are published by the Fédération Cynologique Internationale, or FCI (World Canine Organisation), on the advice of the IDC (International Dobermann Club), which is the Dobermann breed's governing council and has 36 countries in its member list. To become a world champion, dogs are judged to FCI standards. The American Kennel Club (AKC) has its own standards, as do some other countries, although most still adhere to FCI standards. The breed standard describes the Dobermann as a dog of medium size that is also strong and muscularly built. In order to be eligible to meet these standards, the body of the Dobermann should appear to be almost square.
It should also appear elegant and noble.

The dog was originally intended as a guard dog, so males typically have a muscular and intimidating appearance. Females are usually thinner, but should not be spindly.
The AKC breed standard differs from the FCI standards, with the latter being an often larger and heavier dog. This has led some to argue that Dobermanns and Doberman Pinschers should be considered and evaluated differently.

Size and proportions 
The Dobermann has a square frame; its length should equal its height to the withers and the length of its head, neck, and legs should be in proportion to its body.

The standards for the weight of the Dobermann are also described by the FCI. The ideal dog must be of a sufficient size for an optimal combination of strength, endurance and agility.

Color 
Two different color genes exist in the Dobermann: one for black (B) and one for color dilution (D). There are nine possible combinations of these alleles, which can result in four different color phenotypes: black, blue, red, and fawn (Isabella). The traditional and most common color occurs when both the color and dilution genes have at least one dominant allele (i.e., BBDD, BBDd, BbDD or BbDd) and is commonly referred to as black, black and rust, or black and tan. The red, red rust, or brown coloration occurs when the black gene has two recessive alleles but the dilution gene has at least one dominant allele (i.e., bbDD, bbDd). The blue Dobermann has the color gene with at least one dominant allele and the dilution gene with both recessive alleles (i.e., BBdd or Bbdd). The fawn coloration is the least common, occurring only when both the color and dilution genes have two recessive alleles (i.e., bbdd). Thus, the blue color is a diluted black, and the fawn color is a diluted red.

Expression of the color dilution gene is a disorder called Color Dilution Alopecia, a kind of canine follicular dysplasia. Although not life-threatening, these dogs can develop skin problems.

In 1976, a "white" Doberman Pinscher was whelped and was subsequently bred to her son, who was also bred to his litter sisters. This tight inbreeding continued for some time to allow the breeders to "fix" the mutation. This severe inbreeding not only intensified the production of "white" dogs, it also amplified their health problems. White Dobermans are not recognized within professional breeders and continue to be reproduced by unethical breeders marketing them as rare in order to charge more for an animal that would never win a show competition. The white colored Doberman is prone to suffer long term medical conditions ranging from: poor hearing or complete deafness, poor vision or complete blindness, behavioral/temperament issues, cancers (predominately skin cancer), amongst others. White/Albino Dobermanns are actually a cream color with white markings, blue eyes, and pink nose. Although this is consistent with albinism, the proper characterization of the mutation is currently unknown. The animals are commonly known as tyrosinase-positive albinoids, lacking melanin in oculocutaneous structures. This condition is caused by a partial deletion in the SLC45A2 gene.

Tail 
The Dobermann's natural tail is fairly long, but individual dogs often have a short tail as a result of docking, a procedure in which the majority of the tail is surgically removed shortly after birth.

The practice of docking has been around for centuries and is older than the Dobermann as a breed. The historical reason for docking is to ensure that the tail does not get in the way of the dog's work. However, docking has always been controversial. Docking and cropping (see below) have been written out of the Breed Standard by FCI and IDC, and dogs born after 2016 will not be allowed to participate in FCI or IDC shows without a full tail and natural ears. This is mirrored in most EU and Commonwealth countries. In the UK, dogs with docked tails have been banned from show for a number of years and the practice is now illegal for native born dogs. Veterinary Certificates are required as proof to avoid prosecution on imported animals. It has also been made illegal in many other European countries, as well as Australia. The AKC standard for Doberman Pinschers includes a tail docked near the 2nd vertebra. Docking is a common practice in the United States, Russia, and Japan (as well as a number of other countries with Dobermann populations), where it remains legal.

Ears 
Dobermanns often have their ears cropped, a procedure that is thought to be done for functionality for both the traditional guard duty and effective sound localization. According to the Doberman Pinscher Club of America, ears are "normally cropped and carried erect". Like tail docking, ear cropping is illegal in many countries and has never been legal in some Commonwealth countries.

Intelligence 

Canine intelligence is an umbrella term that encompasses the faculties involved in a wide range of mental tasks, such as learning, problem-solving, and communication. The Doberman Pinscher has been ranked amongst the most intelligent dog breeds in experimental studies and expert evaluations. Psychologist Stanley Coren ranks the Dobermann as the 5th most intelligent dog in the category of obedience command training, based on the selective surveys answered by experienced trainers (as documented in his book The Intelligence of Dogs). Additionally, in two studies, Hart and Hart (1985) ranked the Doberman Pinscher first in the same category, and Tortora (1980) gave the Dobermann the highest rank in general trainability. Although methods of evaluation differ, studies have consistently shown that the Doberman Pinscher, along with the Border Collie, Standard Poodle, German Shepherd, Golden Retriever, and Rottweiler, are the most trainable breeds of dog.

Aggression 
Although they are considered to be working dogs, Dobermanns are often stereotyped as being ferocious and aggressive. As a personal protection dog, the Dobermann was originally bred for these traits: it had to be large and intimidating, fearless, and willing to defend its owner from attackers (especially from other guard dogs), but sufficiently obedient and restrained to do so only on command. These traits served the dog well in its role as a personal defense dog, police dog, or war dog, but were not ideally adapted to a companionship role. The Dobermann's aggression has been toned down by modern breeders over the years. Therefore, today's Dobermanns are known to have a much more even and good-natured temperament, as well as extreme loyalty, high intelligence, and great trainability. The modern Dobermann is known to be energetic, watchful, fearless, and obedient.

They can easily learn to respect and protect their owners and are therefore considered by many to be excellent guard dogs. Given that they are properly socialized from a young age, they are generally sociable toward familiar humans and can also be sociable with other dogs. However, Dobermanns do rank among the more-likely breeds to show aggressive behaviour toward strangers and other dogs, though they are not among the most likely to do so. They are highly unlikely to show aggressive behaviour toward their owners.

There is some evidence that Doberman Pinschers in North America have a calmer and more even temperament than their European counterparts because of the breeding strategies employed by American breeders. Because of these differences in breeding strategies, different lines of Doberman Pinschers have developed different traits. Although many contemporary Doberman Pinschers in North America are gentle and friendly to strangers, some lines are bred more true to the original personality standard.

The personality of the Doberman Pinscher is known to be unique. There is a great deal of scientific evidence that Doberman Pinschers have a number of stable psychological traits, such as certain personality factors and intelligence. As early as 1965, studies have shown that there are several broad behavioral traits that significantly predict behavior and are genetically determined. Subsequently, there have been numerous scientific attempts to quantify canine personality or temperament by using statistical techniques for assessing personality traits in humans. These studies often vary in terms of the personality factors they focus on and in terms of ranking breeds differently along these dimensions. One such study found that Doberman Pinschers, compared to other breeds, rank high in playfulness, average in curiosity/fearlessness, low on aggressiveness, and low on sociability. Another such study ranked Doberman Pinschers low on reactivity/surgence and high on aggression/disagreeableness and openness/trainability.

In addition to the studies of canine personality, there has been some research to determine whether there are breed differences in aggression. In a study published in 2008, aggression was divided into four categories: aggression directed at strangers, owner, strange dogs, and rivalry with other household dogs. This study found that the Doberman Pinscher ranked relatively high on stranger-directed aggression, but extremely low on owner-directed aggression. The Doberman Pinscher ranked as average on dog-directed aggression and dog rivalry. Looking only at bites and attempted bites, Doberman Pinschers rank as far less aggressive towards humans and show less aggression than many breeds without a reputation (e.g., Cocker Spaniel, Dalmatian, and Great Dane). This study concluded that aggression has a genetic basis, that the Dobermann shows a distinctive pattern of aggression depending on the situation and that contemporary Doberman Pinschers are not an aggressive breed overall. In regards to Dobermanns attacking owners, it is rare and usually in the case of overdiscipline. Dobermanns accept physical punishment to an extent. However, when they consider it to no longer be punishment, but an attack on themselves, they will defend themselves.

According to the Centers for Disease Control and Prevention, between 1979 and 1998, the Doberman Pinscher was involved in attacks on humans resulting in fatalities less frequently than several other dog breeds such as German Shepherd Dogs, Rottweilers, Husky-type dogs, wolf-dog hybrids and Alaskan Malamutes. According to this Centers for Disease Control and Prevention study, one of the most important factors contributing to dog bites is the level of responsibility exercised by dog owners.

Health
The Dobermann's lifespan is about 10–13 years on average. The breed is prone to a number of health concerns. Common serious health problems include dilated cardiomyopathy (DCM),
 cervical vertebral instability (CVI), von Willebrand's disease (a bleeding disorder for which genetic testing has been available since 2000), and prostatic disease. Less serious common health concerns include hypothyroidism and hip dysplasia. Canine compulsive disorder is also common. Studies have shown that the Doberman Pinscher suffers from prostatic diseases (such as bacterial prostatiti, prostatic cysts, prostatic adenocarcinoma, and benign hyperplasia), more than any other breed. 
 
Dilated cardiomyopathy is a major cause of death in Dobermanns. This disease affects the breed more than any other. Nearly 40% of DCM diagnoses are for Dobermann Pinschers, followed by German Shepherds at 13%. More recent studies based on European dogs, however, has indicated that DCM affected rates are much higher for this population than their American relatives: around 58% of European Dobermanns will develop DCM within their lifetime. Research has shown that the breed is affected by an attenuated wavy fiber type of DCM that affects many other breeds, as well as an additional fatty infiltration-degenerative type that appears to be specific to Dobermann Pinscher and Boxer breeds.
This serious disease is likely to be fatal in most Dobermanns affected.

Roughly a quarter of Dobermann Pinschers who develop cardiomyopathy die suddenly from seemingly unknown causes, and an additional fifty percent die of congestive heart failure. Among female Dobermanns, the sudden death manifestation of the disease is more common, whereas males tend to develop congestive heart failure. In addition to being more prevalent in Dobermanns, this disease is also more serious in the breed. Following a diagnosis, the average non-Dobermann has an expected survival time of 8 months; for Dobermann Pinschers, however, the expected survival time is less than two months. Although the causes for the disease are largely unknown, there is evidence that it is a familial disease inherited as an autosomal dominant trait. Investigation into the genetic causes of canine DCM may lead to therapeutic and breeding practices to limit its impact.

History

Dobermanns were first bred in the 1880s by Karl Friedrich Louis Dobermann in Apolda, Thuringia, Germany, a tax collector who ran the Apolda dog pound. With access to dogs of many breeds, he got the idea to create a breed that would be ideal for protecting him. He set out to breed a new type of dog that would exhibit impressive stamina, strength, and intelligence. Five years after Dobermann's death, Otto Goeller, one of the earliest breeders, created the National Doberman Pinscher Club and is considered to have perfected the breed, breeding and refining them in the 1890s.

The breed is believed to have been created from several different breeds of dogs that had the characteristics that Dobermann was looking for. The exact ratios of mixing, and even the exact breeds that were used, remain uncertain, although many experts believe that the Dobermann Pinscher is a combination of several breeds including the Beauceron, German Pinscher, Rottweiler and Weimaraner. The single exception is the documented crossing with the Greyhound and Manchester Terrier. It is also widely believed that the old German Shepherd was the single largest contributor to the Dobermann breed. Philip Greunig's The Dobermann Pinscher (1939) describes the breed's early development by Otto Goeller, who helped to establish the breed. The American Kennel Club believes the breeds utilized to develop the Dobermann Pinscher may have included the old shorthaired shepherd, Rottweiler, Black and Tan Terrier and the German Pinscher.

After Dobermann's death in 1894, the Germans named the breed Dobermann-pinscher in his honor, but a half century later dropped the word 'pinscher' on the grounds that this German word for 'terrier' was no longer appropriate. The British did the same a few years later; now the US and Canada are the only countries who continue to use Pinscher and have dropped an "n" from Dobermann's surname.

During World War II, the United States Marine Corps adopted the Doberman Pinscher as its official war dog, although the Corps did not exclusively use this breed in the role.

In the United States, the American Kennel Club ranked the Doberman Pinscher as the 12th most popular dog breed in 2012 and 2013.

Popularity
The Dobermann became very popular over a short period of time. It is a relatively new breed, less than 150 years old. According to the latest ranking in 2017 by the American Kennel Club, Dobermanns are the 16th most popular dog breed. Dobermanns started to become popular when they were used in World War II as guard dogs. In the 1970s, Dobermanns had their fair share in movies. They starred in the 1972 American film The Doberman Gang. Dobermanns also became popular after winning four Westminster Kennel Club Dog Shows in 1939, 1952, 1953 and 1989. The Dobermann was recognised (as the Doberman Pinscher) by the American Kennel Club in 1908 and since then they have been one of the most popular dog breeds due to their intelligence and agility. Even today, the numbers of Dobermann dog registrations are increasing.

Notable Dobermanns

 Graf Belling v. Grönland: first registered Dobermann, in 1898.
 First Dobermann registered with the American Kennel Club, 1908 
 Cappy, a Dobermann who saved the lives of 250 U.S. Marines when he alerted them to Japanese soldiers. Another Dobermann named Kurt became the first K-9 casualty, 23 July, when he was mortally wounded by a Japanese grenade. Kurt was the first to be buried in what would become the War Dog Cemetery and he is the dog depicted in bronze sitting quiet but alert atop the World War II War Dog Memorial. Cappy, Kurt and 23 other Dobermanns whose names are inscribed on the memorial, died fighting with the US Marine Corps against Japanese forces on Guam in 1944.
 Ch. Rancho Dobe's Storm: consecutive Westminster Best in Show (1952, 1953).
 Bingo von Ellendonk: first Dobermann to score 300 points (perfect score) in Schutzhund.
 Ch. Borong the Warlock: won his championship title in three countries, including 230 Best of Breed, 30 Specialty Show "bests," six all-breed Best in Show, and 66 Working Groups. He was the only Dobermann ever to have won the Doberman Pinscher Club of America National Specialty Show three times, and in 1961 five Dobermann specialists judged him Top in the breed in an annual Top Ten competition event.
 Tunga: Female Doberman Pinscher police dog in Karnataka India, who is famous for uncovering more than 50 murders and 60 thefts including one case where she ran more than 12 km to catch the murderer.

See also

 List of dog breeds

References

External links

Dog breeds originating in Germany
FCI breeds